FictionCity is a social networking service created in 2011. The service provides the facilities for  artists to display their work  through a multimedia portfolio, and for employers to hire  artists, in the  nine disciplines supported by the platform.

FictionCity is a geosocial network. The platform integrates geolocation tools allowing users to connect and coordinate with local people, ateliers or events that match their interests. The website is translated into twelve languages.

The company was founded and its principal offices remain located,  in Buenos Aires, Argentina. It also has offices in San Pablo, Santiago de Chile, Miami, Mexico City and Barcelona.

The service was   created by the Argentine computer engineer, Silvio Pestrin Farina,.   The company was reportedly created with an initial investment of $1 million and just three months later was already worth $18 million.

Appliance FICCY 

FictionCity is constituted in 2014 as the creator of Appliance FICCY.

The Appliance "FICCY" is connected to the datacenter of the acquirer, registers the information generated by users and intelligently organizes the information to address product proposals to the end users. At the same time it enables the company to provide high impact advertising and services in real time. The appliance is capable of distinguishing the different channels (connections) to the end users (Mobile or web) and act accordingly.

Business Context / Main Highlights 
 
The most important Internet players, Facebook and Google, offer their products and services for free for one simple reason. "Users are the product." The new business model paradigm relays on the capability of obtaining as much as possible profit from the use of this information. Monitoring the users and making an interpretation of what these users are doing on the Internet are the two key drivers.

References

External links 
 Homepage of FictionCity
 Homepage of Ficcy

Argentine social networking websites